Amuchástegui is a surname. Notable people with the surname include:

Luis Antonio Amuchástegui (born 1960), Argentine footballer
María Amuchástegui (1953–2017), Argentine television fitness instructor, ballerina, and singer